Sultanuşağı is a village in the Elazığ District of Elazığ Province in Turkey. The village is populated by Kurds of the Herdî tribe and had a population of 87 in 2021.

The hamlets of Budaklı, Mollahasan and Süleyman are attached to the village.

References

Villages in Elazığ District
Kurdish settlements in Elazığ Province